A student fee or student activity fee is a fee charged to students at a school, college, university or other place of learning that is in addition to any matriculation and/or tuition fees. It may be charged to support student organizations and student activities (for which it can be called an activity fee) or for intercollegiate programs such as intramural sports or visiting academics; or, at a public university or college, as a means to remedy shortfalls in state funding (in which case it can often be called a technology fee). Further fees may then be charged for features and facilities such as insurance, health and parking provision.

United States

Constitutionality of activity fees
In the United States, the constitutionality of mandatory student activity fees has been adjudicated several times by the Supreme Court. Most recently, the Court has ruled that public universities may subsidize political groups by means of a mandatory student activity fees so long as the manner in which such funds are dispersed are political neutral.

Despite the commentary of the US Supreme Court, most student activity fee funds are today used by-and-large for non-political purposes.

Student fee cases
 Rosenberger v. University of Virginia, 515 U. S. 819 (1995)
Board of Regents of the University of Wisconsin System v. Southworth

Examples

University of New Hampshire 
The Student Activity Fee of the University of New Hampshire is relatively unique amongst other comparable institutions of secondary education in that the fee is administered by its autonomous student government, free from faculty or staff advisors. During fiscal year 2019, all undergraduate students attending UNH paid $89 towards their fee.

See also 

 Higher education in the United States
 College tuition in the United States

References 

Student organizations
Education finance
Political activism
Civil rights and liberties